HMS Murray (F91) was one of a dozen Blackwood-class frigate (also known as the Type 14 class) of second-rate anti-submarine frigates built for the Royal Navy in the 1950s. She was named for George Murray, who served during the late 18th and early 19th centuries.

Description
The ships were powered by one English Electric geared steam turbine that drove the single propeller shaft, using steam provided by two Babcock & Wilcox boilers. Their complement was 140 officers and ratings.

The ships were armed with three Bofors 40 mm guns in single mounts. The mount on the quarterdeck was later removed as it was unusable in heavy seas. They were equipped with two triple-barrelled Limbo Mark 10 anti-submarine mortars. The Blackwood-class ships had the same sonar suite as the larger s where the Limbo mortars were controlled by three sonars, the Type 174 search set, Type 162 target-classification set and the Type 170 'pencil beam' targeting set to determine the bearing and depth of the target.

Construction and career
Murray was laid down by Alexander Stephen and Sons at their Govan shipyard on 30 November 1953, launched on 25 February 1954 and completed on 5 June 1956. The ship is featured with other Type 14 frigates in the 1960 Norman Wisdom film The Bulldog Breed. The ship was also shown working with coastal command, practicing submarine hunting, in a coastal command training film from the 1950s.

Notes

Bibliography

 

 

Blackwood-class frigates
1954 ships